Asyprocessa laevi is a moth of the family Erebidae first described by Michael Fibiger in 2010. It is known from northern and north-western Thailand.

The wingspan is about 8 mm. The head, patagia, tegulae, thorax, basal part of the costa, costal part of the medial area and the terminal area, including the fringes are grey brown. The costal medial area is quadrangular. The forewing is narrow, pointed at the apex and the ground colour is yellow. The crosslines are all present, narrow and brown. The terminal line is marked by black interneural dots. The hindwing is grey, with an indistinct discal spot.

References

Micronoctuini
Moths described in 2010